Alberto Iglesias Fernández-Berridi (born 21 October 1955) is a Spanish composer. He was first noticed as a score composer for Spanish films, mostly from Pedro Almodóvar and Julio Medem. His career became more international with time and he eventually started to work also in Hollywood. Since then, he has been nominated four times for an Academy Award for his work in the films The Constant Gardener (2005), The Kite Runner (2007), Tinker Tailor Soldier Spy (2011), and Parallel Mothers (2021). His other film credits include soundtracks for Steven Soderbergh's Che. and Hossein Amini's The Two Faces of January (2014). He also has worked for ballet and has done other classical music work.

Early and personal life
Alberto Iglesias Fernández-Berridi was born in 1955 in San Sebastián.  His sister is visual artist Cristina Iglesias. Iglesias was the brother-in-law of the late Spanish sculptor, Juan Muñoz.

Career
Iglesias studied harmony and counterpoint at the Conservatory of his home city, with Francisco Escudero, continuing his education in Paris, where he studied composition and piano, and at Phonos studios, in Barcelona, where he learned electronic music. Afterwards, he created a duo of electronic music with Javier Navarrete, who worked and performed together from 1981 to 1986. He began working in film composition in the 1980s. Iglesias has composed a number of scores for films directed by Pedro Almodóvar, such as The Flower of My Secret (1995), Live Flesh (1997), All About My Mother (1999), Talk to Her (2002), Bad Education (2004), Volver (2006), Broken Embraces (2009) and The Skin I Live In (2011).

Iglesias also composed the music for Sex and Lucia (2001), directed by Julio Medem and for Oliver Stone's documentary, Comandante (2003).

Iglesias garnered his first Oscar nomination for his score in Fernando Meirelles's film adaptation of The Constant Gardener (2005).  Iglesias also composed the score for The Kite Runner (2007), based on Khaled Hosseini's 2003 novel of the same name.  He earned his second Oscar nomination for that score.

In 2008, Iglesias composed Steven Soderbergh's 2008 two part biopic, Che (2008), starring Benicio del Toro as Che Guevara.

That same year, Iglesias composed the music for Tomas Alfredson's film adaptation of Tinker Tailor Soldier Spy, starring Gary Oldman as George Smiley.  Iglesias told the Los Angeles Times, "(Alfredson) explained to me very well what this film is about.  It's a film about loyalties and human relationships. Their spies are victims of this moment. That was the most important thing he told me. The film and the music show the more human side."  He received his third Oscar nomination for the latter film.

Work

Film

Ballet
Iglesias composed the musical score for four ballets produced by Spanish choreographer Nacho Duato and the Spanish National Dance Company. 
 1992 – Cautiva
 1994 – Tabulae
 1995 – Cero sobre Cero
 1997 – Self

Awards and nominations

See also
 List of Spanish Academy Award winners and nominees

References

External links
Alberto Iglesias Official Site

1955 births
20th-century classical composers
20th-century Spanish male musicians
21st-century classical composers
21st-century male musicians
European Film Award for Best Composer winners
Living people
Male film score composers
Spanish classical composers
Spanish film score composers
Spanish male classical composers